Robert Stephen "Duffy" Cobbs (born January 17, 1964) is a former professional American football player. He played defensive back for Penn State's 1982 and 1986 national championship teams, and one season (1987) in the National Football League for the New England Patriots.

He was named to Bleacher Report's "Penn State All-Time Defensive Team".

References

Living people
American football defensive backs
Penn State Nittany Lions football players
Sportspeople from Alexandria, Virginia
Players of American football from Virginia
New England Patriots players
1964 births